Mel Denham (born January 24, 1981) is an American rugby union player, and coach.

She played for the United States women's national rugby union team, at the Flanker position. She participated at the 2010 Women's Rugby World Cup.
She graduated from Bridgewater State University.
She coached at Central Washington University, and Harvard University.

References

External links 
 USA Rugby Profile
 Get to Know: Head Women's Rugby Coach Mel Denham, Central Washington University

1981 births
Living people
United States women's international rugby union players
American female rugby union players
Place of birth missing (living people)